Shull is a surname. Notable people with the surname include:

Andrew Shull (born 1981), American football player
Avriel Shull (1931–1976), American architect
Clifford Shull (1915–2001), American physicist
Denise Shull (born 1959), American writer
Ernest M. Shull (1915–2002), American missionary and naturalist
George Harrison Shull (1874–1954), American geneticist
J. Marion Shull (1872–1948), American botanical illustrator and plant breeder
Joseph Horace Shull (1848–1944), American politician
Laurens Shull (1894–1918), American football player
Megan Shull (born 1969), American writer
Paul Shull (born 1973), Canadian music manager
Richard B. Shull (1929–1999), American actor
Darren Dunifon Shull (born 1964), American Attorney in Florida

See also
Shull Rocks, rock formation in Graham Land, Antarctica